Perunthenaruvi Weir is a divertion dam built across Pamba river at villages of Naranammoozhi and Vechoochira in Pathanamthitta District of Kerala,  India. Perumthenaruvi SHEP 6 MW (2×3) is a run- of- the- river scheme in river Pamba, and the weir is a part of this scheme. This envisages the utilization of water from 442 Km catchment of Pamba and Azhutha river for electricity generation under a net head of 18.00 m. The power house is located on the left bank of Pamba river.

Taluks through which the release flow are Ranni, Konni, Kozhencherry, Thiruvalla, Chengannur, Kuttanadu, Mavelikara and Karthikappally.

Specifications
Latitude : 9⁰ 24′ 44 ” N
Longitude: 76⁰ 52′ 48” E
Panchayath : Ranni- Perinad
Village : Naranammoozhi & Vechoochira
District : Pathanamthitta
River Basin : Pamba
River: Pamba
Release from Dam to river : Pamba
Type of Dam : Concrete – Gravity
Classification : Weir
Maximum Water Level (MWL) : EL 55.20 m
Full Reservoir Level ( FRL) : EL 51.0 m
Storage at FRL : 1.00 Mm3
Height from deepest foundation : 10.93 m
Length : 227.50 m
Spillway : Ungated- Overflow section
Year of completion : 2017
Crest LevelEL : 51.00 m
Name of Project : Perunthenaruvi SHEP
River Outlet : 2 Nos. 2.00x 4.00m

Hydrology 
 Catchment area - 442 Sq. km
 Average Annual Yield - 1093 Mm3 
 Peak flood at the diversion weir - 395Cumecs

Tourism

The Poonthenaruvi Water falls and related Eco tourism project is near the weir site. There is hanging bridge and view towers to spectate the beauty of the ravine.

References 

Dams in Kerala
Dams completed in 2017